This is a list of notable alumni of the Pi Kappa Alpha fraternity

Business

Government and politics

Military

Education

News, Art, and Entertainment

Religion

Sports

References 

Pi Kappa Alpha
brothers